Belonion is a genus of freshwater needlefishes native to South America. It is one of 10 genera in the family Belonidae.

Species
Two recognized species are in this genus:
 Belonion apodion Collette, 1966
 Belonion dibranchodon Collette, 1966

References

 
Belonidae